A list of films produced in Egypt in 1986. For an A-Z list of films currently on Wikipedia, see :Category:Egyptian films.

External links
 Egyptian films of 1986 at the Internet Movie Database
 Egyptian films of 1986 elCinema.com

Lists of Egyptian films by year
1986 in Egypt
Lists of 1986 films by country or language